In Maharashtra and Gujarat, their traditional occupations include acting as palanquin-bearers.

The Bhoi are also found in Assam.

Notes

Social groups of Maharashtra
Social groups of Gujarat
Fishing castes
Social groups of Odisha